Kari or Saturn XLV is a natural satellite of Saturn. Its discovery was announced by Scott S. Sheppard, David C. Jewitt, Jan Kleyna, and Brian G. Marsden on 26 June 2006 from observations taken between January and April 2006.

Kari is about 7 kilometres in diameter, and orbits Saturn at an average distance of 22,305,100 km in 1243.71 days, at an inclination of 148.4° to the ecliptic (151.5° to Saturn's equator), in a retrograde direction and with an eccentricity of 0.3405. The rotation period has been determined to be  hours. The light curve is similar to Hyrrokkin's, having two deep and one shallow minima, and the moon is probably triangular in shape.

It was named in April 2007 after Kári, son of Fornjót, the personification of wind in Norse mythology.

References 

 Institute for Astronomy Saturn Satellite Data
 IAUC 8727: Satellites of Saturn June 30, 2006 (discovery)
 MPEC 2006-M45: Eight New Satellites of Saturn June 26, 2006 (discovery and ephemeris)
 IAUC 8826: Satellites of Jupiter and Saturn April 5, 2007 (naming the moon)
 Denk, T., Mottola, S. (2013): Irregular Saturnian Moon Lightcurves from Cassini-ISS Observations: Update. Abstract 406.08, DPS conference 2013, Denver (Colorado), October 10, 2013 (synodic rotation period)

Norse group
Moons of Saturn
Irregular satellites
Discoveries by Scott S. Sheppard
Astronomical objects discovered in 2006
Moons with a retrograde orbit